Phelsuma gouldi is a species of gecko endemic to Haute Matsiatra region of Madagascar.

References

Phelsuma
Endemic fauna of Madagascar
Reptiles of Madagascar
Reptiles described in 2011
Taxa named by Angelica Crottini